Jinji Road station may refer to:

 Jinji Road station (Hangzhou Metro), a metro station in Hangzhou, China
 Jinji Road station (Shanghai Metro), a metro station in Shanghai, China

See also
 Jinjing Road station, Shanghai Metro